Two submarines of the Chilean Navy have borne the name Thomson.

 a  launched as USS Springer in 1944, renamed on acquisition by Chile in 1961 and serving until 1972
 a Type 209 submarine launched in 1982

Chilean Navy ship names